Konohana Arena is an arena in Shizuoka, Shizuoka, Japan. It is the home arena of the Veltex Shizuoka of the B.League, Japan's professional basketball league.

Facilities
 Main arena - 3,772m2（82m×46m）

References

Basketball venues in Japan
Indoor arenas in Japan
Sports venues in Shizuoka Prefecture
Buildings and structures in Shizuoka (city)
Sports venues completed in 2015
2015 establishments in Japan
Veltex Shizuoka